Burian is a Slavic surname. Feminine form is Burianová. Alternative spellings include Burián and Burjan. The name may refer to:

Batilda Salha Burian (born 1965), Tanzanian diplomat
Emil Burian (1876–1926), Czech singer
Emil František Burian (1904–1959), Czech writer
Ewald Burian (1896–1981), German soldier
Hildegard Burjan (1883–1933), Austrian politician
Jan Burian (born 1952), Czech musician and television presenter
Jitka Burianová (born 1977), Czech athlete
Karel Burian (1870–1924), Czech singer
László Burján (born 1985), Hungarian judoka
Leonardo Burián (born 1984), Uruguayan football player
Michal Burian (born 1992), Australian Paralympic javelin thrower
Peter Burian (born 1959), Slovak diplomat
Stephan Burián von Rajecz (1851–1922), Austro-Hungarian politician
Vilém Burian (born 1988), Czech ice hockey player
Vlasta Burian (1891–1962), Czech actor and singer
Zdeněk Burian (1905–1981), Czech artist

Other uses
7867 Burian, main-belt asteroid
Burjan (Mirpur), Pakistan
Burjan, Požarevac, Serbia

Czech-language surnames
Slovak-language surnames